Ramal da Base Aérea da Maceda is a closed railway line in Portugal which connected the railway halt of Carvalheira-Maceda, on the Linha do Norte, to the Ovar military airbase. By 2010, the tracks had been removed, with only the overhead pillars remaining.

See also
List of railway lines in Portugal
List of Portuguese locomotives and railcars
History of rail transport in Portugal

References

Mac
Iberian gauge railways